{{Automatic taxobox
| name = Bedotia sp. nov. 'Ankavia-Ankavanana'
| image =
| status = VU
| status_system = IUCN3.1
| status_ref = <ref>{{cite iucn |author=Loiselle, P. |date=2004 |title=Bedotia sp. nov. 'Ankavia-Ankavanana |volume=2004 |page=e.T44475A10906588 |doi=10.2305/IUCN.UK.2004.RLTS.T44475A10906588.en |access-date=12 November 2021}}</ref>
| taxon = Bedotia
| species_text = B. sp. nov. 'Ankavia-Ankavanana'| binomial_text = Bedotia sp. nov. 'Ankavia-Ankavanana'
| authority = 
| synonyms = 
}}Bedotia'' sp. nov. 'Ankavia-Ankavanana' ''' is an undescribed species of fish in the family Bedotiidae. It is endemic to Madagascar, where its natural habitat is rivers. It is threatened by habitat loss.

References

Bedotia
Freshwater fish of Madagascar
Undescribed vertebrate species
Taxonomy articles created by Polbot